Lawrence Martin may refer to:

 Lawrence Martin (journalist) (born 1948), Canadian journalist
 Lawrence Martin (musician) (born 1956), Canadian musician and mayor
 Lawrence Martin-Bittman, formerly Ladislav Bittman, see Operation Neptune
 Lawrence Martin (geographer) (1880–1955), professor of physiography and geography

See also
Laurence Martin (born 1928), former Vice-Chancellor of Newcastle University
Larry Martin (1943–2013), paleontologist and curator
Larry A. Martin (born 1957), Republican member of the South Carolina Senate
Larry Martyn (1934–1994), English actor
Martin Lawrence (disambiguation)